The Kyosu Shinmun ((); translated as Professors' News) is a newspaper in South Korea with a circulation of 65,000. The Kyosu Shinmun was founded on April 15, 1992.

References

External links
Official website 

Newspapers published in South Korea